Richard Anthony Girvan (born 30 December 1973) in Auckland is a New Zealand international lawn bowler.

Bowls career
In 2008 he won the gold medal in the fours at the 2008 World Outdoor Bowls Championship in Christchurch along with Gary Lawson, Russell Meyer and Andrew Todd.

Girvan represented New Zealand at both the 2010 Commonwealth Games and the 2014 Commonwealth Games.

He won four medals at the Asia Pacific Bowls Championships, of which two have been gold medals.

He won the 2005, 2014/15 and 2016/17 fours title at the New Zealand National Bowls Championships when bowling for the Taren Point and Onehunga Bowls Clubs respectively.

References

External links
 
 
 
 

1973 births
Living people
New Zealand male bowls players
Bowls World Champions
Commonwealth Games competitors for New Zealand
Bowls players at the 2006 Commonwealth Games
Bowls players at the 2010 Commonwealth Games
Bowls players at the 2014 Commonwealth Games
20th-century New Zealand people
21st-century New Zealand people